Thursbitch is a novel by English writer Alan Garner, named after the valley in the Pennines of England where the action occurs (also listed in the 1841 OS map as "Thursbatch"). It was published in 2003.

Plot
Set both in the 18th century and the present day, the novel centres on the mystery of an inscription on an extant engraved wayside stone tablet about a death from exposure.

Major themes
The book features shamanic use of the fly agaric mushroom and a piece of Derbyshire Blue John as plot elements.

Literary significance and criticism
The book is seen by critics of Garner's work as a continuation of styles and structures first used in Red Shift (1973) and Strandloper (1996).

References

2003 British novels
2003 fantasy novels
Novels by Alan Garner
Novels set in Cheshire
Blue John (mineral)
Harvill Secker books